1912 Anubis is a stony Koronis asteroid from the outer region of the asteroid belt, approximately  in diameter. It was named after the Egyptian deity Anubis.

Orbit and classification 

The S-type asteroid is a member of the Koronis family, a group consisting of about 200 known bodies. It orbits the Sun in the outer main-belt at a distance of 2.6–3.2 AU once every 4 years and 11 months (1,810 days). Its orbit has an eccentricity of 0.09 and an inclination of 3° with respect to the ecliptic.

Discovery 

Anubis was discovered on 24 September 1960, by the Dutch and Dutch–American astronomers Ingrid and Cornelis van Houten at Leiden, and Tom Gehrels, who took the photographic plates at Palomar Observatory, California. On the same night, the trio of astronomers also discovered 1923 Osiris, 1924 Horus and 5011 Ptah, also named after Ancient Egyptian deities.

The survey designation "P-L" stands for Palomar–Leiden, named after Palomar Observatory and Leiden Observatory, which collaborated on the fruitful Palomar–Leiden survey in the 1960s. Gehrels used Palomar's Samuel Oschin telescope (also known as the 48-inch Schmidt Telescope), and shipped the photographic plates to Ingrid and Cornelis van Houten at Leiden Observatory where astrometry was carried out. The trio are credited with the discovery of several thousand minor planets.

Naming 

This minor planet was named after Anubis, the jackal-headed Egyptian god and protector of the dead. The approved naming citation was published by the Minor Planet Center on 1 November 1979.

Physical characteristics 

According to the survey carried out by NASA's Wide-field Infrared Survey Explorer with its subsequent NEOWISE mission, Anubis measures 10.407 kilometers in diameter and its surface has an albedo of 0.382, while the Collaborative Asteroid Lightcurve Link (CALL) assumes a standard albedo for stony members of the Koronis family of 0.24, and calculates a diameter of 10.28 kilometers with an absolute magnitude of 12.11.

In 2010 and 2012, two rotational lightcurves of Anubis were obtained from photometric observations at the Palomar Transient Factory in California. Lightcurve analysis gave a rotation period of 4.626 and 4.628 hours with a brightness amplitude of 0.47 and 0.18 magnitude, respectively. CALL adopts the shorter period of 4.626 hours.

References

External links 
 Asteroid Lightcurve Database (LCDB), query form (info )
 Dictionary of Minor Planet Names, Google books
 Asteroids and comets rotation curves, CdR – Observatoire de Genève, Raoul Behrend
 Discovery Circumstances: Numbered Minor Planets (1)-(5000)  – Minor Planet Center
 
 

001912
Discoveries by Cornelis Johannes van Houten
Discoveries by Ingrid van Houten-Groeneveld
Discoveries by Tom Gehrels
6534
Named minor planets
19600924